Skin and Bones may refer to:

Music
Skin and Bones (Flashy Python album), the 2009 debut album by Flashy Python 
Skin and Bones (Foo Fighters album), a 2006 live album by the Foo Fighters 
"Skin and Bones" (song), originally a B-side track from the Foo Fighters' 2005 album In Your Honor but also released on the above live album
Skin and Bones (Lyriel album), a 2014 studio album by Lyriel
"Skin and Bones", a song by Jet released on their second studio album Shine On.

Other uses
 Skin & Bones (novel), a 2000 Hardy Boys book
"Skin and Bones" (Fear Itself), the eighth episode of NBC series Fear Itself

See also
Skin & Bone (disambiguation)